James Charles Wainman (born 25 January 1993) is an English cricketer. He was born at Harrogate in Yorkshire and was educated at Leeds Grammar School.

He joined the staff at Yorkshire County Cricket Club and made his debut on 31 July 2014 against the touring Sri Lanka A cricket team. He made his Twenty20 debut on 27 May 2016 for Yorkshire against Leicestershire Foxes in the 2016 NatWest t20 Blast and played a total of six limited-overs matches for the county.

Wainman left Yorkshire at the end of the 2018 season and played in the 2019 Minor Counties Trophy for Lincolnshire before joining Warwickshire, initially on a short term contract as cover for injured players, during June. He made his first-class cricket debut on 30 June 2019, against Kent in the 2019 County Championship, taking three wickets on debut.

References

External links
 

1993 births
Living people
Warwickshire cricketers
Yorkshire cricketers
English cricketers
Cricketers from Harrogate
English cricketers of the 21st century
Lincolnshire cricketers